Hemiphora lanata is a flowering plant in the mint family Lamiaceae and is endemic to the south-west of Western Australia. It is a sprawling shrub with its branches and leaves densely covered with white, woolly hairs and with deep pink or dark red, curved, tube-shaped flowers with spreading petal lobes on the end. It is similar to Hemiphora exserta except for its cottony leaf-covering and its longer stamens.

Description
The similar H. exserta has leaves that are rough and warty on the upper surface and have short soft hairs on the lower surface of young leaves.

The sepals are scaly on the outside, linear to lance-shaped and remain attached to the plant after the petals have fallen. The petal tube has soft hairs on the outside but glabrous inside except for a densely hairy ring around the ovary. The five petal lobes form two "lips", the upper lip with two short lobes and the lower with three. The four stamens extend beyond the end of the petal tube with the lower pair longer than the upper pair. (H. exserta has stamens that are about the same length as the petal tube.)

Taxonomy and naming
This species was first formally described in 1979 by Ahmad Abid Munir who gave it the name Pityrodia exserta var. lanata. The description was published in Adelaide Botanic Garden. In 2011, Barry Conn, Murray Henwood and Nicola Streiber raised the variety to species status and transferred four species, including this one, from the genus Pityrodia into Hemiphora. The specific epithet (lanata) is a Latin word meaning "woolly".

Distribution and habitat
Hemiphora lanata mainly occurs between Ravensthorpe, Hyden and Norseman in the Coolgardie and Mallee biogeographic regions where it grows in sandy or salty clay on plains. It generally grows in more inland areas than H. exserta, although the two species sometimes grow near each other

Conservation
Hemiphora lanata is classified as "not threatened" by the Western Australian Government Department of Parks and Wildlife.

References

External links
Instagram image of Hemiphora exserta

exserta
Plants described in 1979
Flora of Western Australia